Bhubaneswar City Bus or Dream Team Shahara is a public transport bus service run in Bhubaneswar, Odisha. It is run in public–private partnership between Bhubaneswar-Puri Transport Service Limited (BPTSL) and Dream Team Shahara (DTS) under Jawaharlal Nehru National Urban Renewal Mission. A fleet of 150 buses cover all major destinations across the city; and with Cuttack, Puri and Khordha. The service was started in October 2010. 
The bus depot is one of the main bus stands connecting to all the other smaller bus stands throughout the city.

Depots
Central Depot - Master Canteen 
Baramunda Bus Depot

Routes

References

External links

Metropolitan transport agencies of India
Transport in Bhubaneswar
Companies based in Bhubaneswar
Transport companies established in 2010
2010 establishments in Orissa
Indian companies established in 2010